Physogyra is a genus of cnidarians belonging to the family Plerogyridae.

The species of this genus are found in Indian and Pacific Ocean.

Species:

Physogyra astraeiformis 
Physogyra exerta 
Physogyra gravieri 
Physogyra lichtensteini 
Physogyra somaliensis

References

Cnidarians